was a concert tour by Japanese singer Misia and the ninth installment of the Hoshizora Live concert series. The tour began on May 3, 2016 at Kawaguchiko Stellar Theater in Fujikawaguchiko, Yamanashi and concluded on July 15, 2016 at Orix Theater in Osaka, Osaka, comprising two legs and a total of eight shows.

Background
On December 10, 2015, Misia announced the first dates of the tour. The first three shows, which constitute the first leg of the tour, would take place at Kawaguchiko Stellar Theater on consecutive days starting May 3, 2016. The shows were held to commemorate the 20th anniversary of Rhythmedia, the production and management company representing Misia. Ticket sales opened to the general public on February 27, 2016. The first pressing of the live compilation album Misia Hoshizora no Live Song Book: History of Hoshizora Live included a pre-sale access code which allowed fans to participate in a raffle to win tickets to the shows.

The second round of tour dates was announced on March 1, 2016, for which tickets went on sale May 28, 2016. Band members for the tour were announced on April 25, 2016. The following day, DJ Emma, Muro and DJ Nori were announced as special guests for the opening ceremony of each date, respectively.

Set list
The first three dates of the tour featured totally different set lists for each show. Misia sang a total of 49 songs during the first leg of the tour. The second leg of the tour featured four different acts.

First leg
This set list is representative of the concert on May 3, 2016. It does not represent all concerts for the duration of the tour.

"Believe"
"Sunny Day"
"Back Blocks"
"La La La"
"Ame no Nichiyōbi" ("Rainy Sunday")
"Hoshi no Yō ni..."
"Tsuki" ("Moon")
"Wasurenai Hibi"
"The Best of Time"
"Ano Natsu no Mama de" ("Like That Summer")
"Shiawase o Forever"
"The Glory Day"
Encore
"Oh Lovely Day"
"Anata ni Smile :)"
Double Encore
"Hoshi no Furu Oka" ("Starry Hill")

{{hidden
| headercss = background: #ffe6ff; font-size: 100%; width: 95%;
| contentcss = text-align: left; font-size: 100%; width: 95%;
| header = May 4, 2016 set list
| content =

"Hi no Ataru Basho / Key of Love (Ai no Yukue)"
"Mayonaka no Hide-and-seek"
"Remember Lady"
"Mekubase no Blues" ("The Winking Blues")
"Escape"
"Chiheisen no Mukōgawa e" ("Beyond the Horizon")
"Boku no Kimochi" ("What I Feel")
"Shiroi Kisetsu"
"Aitakute Ima"
"Deepness"
"Hoshi no Ginka"
"Luv Parade" (Soul Mix version)
"The Glory Day"
Encore
"Oh Lovely Day"
"Anata ni Smile :)"
"Nagareboshi"

}}

{{hidden
| headercss = background: #ffe6ff; font-size: 100%; width: 95%;
| contentcss = text-align: left; font-size: 100%; width: 95%;
| header = May 5, 2016 set list
| content =

"Maware Maware"
"Color of Life / Re-Brain"
"Nocturne"
"Chandelier"
"Atsui Namida" ("Warm Tears")
"Nemurenu Yoru wa Kimi no Sei"
"Soba ni Ite..." ("Stay by My Side...")
"It's Just Love"
"Everything"
"Orphans no Namida"
"Shining Star"
"We Are the Music"
"The Glory Day"
Encore
"Oh Lovely Day"
"Anata ni Smile :)"
"Tsutsumikomu Yō ni..."
Double Encore
"Hoshi no Furu Oka"

}}

Second leg
This set list is representative of the concert on July 7, 2016. It does not represent all concerts for the duration of the tour.

"Believe"
"Hi no Ataru Basho" / "Key of Love (Ai no Yukue)" ("Key of Love (Love's Whereabouts")
"Color of Life" / "Re-Brain"
"Tsutsumikomu Yō ni..."
"Mayonaka no Hide-and-seek" ("Midnight Hide-and-seek")
"The Best of Time"
"Nemurenu Yoru wa Kimi no Sei"
"Orphans no Namida"
"Ashita e"
"Hoshi no Ginka" ("Silver Star Coin")
"Holiday" / "We Are the Music"
"Shiawase o Forever"
"The Glory Day"
Encore
Oh Lovely Day"
"Anata ni Smile :)"
"Super Rainbow"

Shows

Personnel

Band
 Misia – lead vocals
 Tohru Shigemi – keyboard
 Shūhei Yamaguchi – guitar
 Satoshi Yoshida - guitar
 Jino – bass
 Tomo Kanno – drums
 Akio Suzuki - sax, flute
 Kumi Sasaki – backing vocals, organ
 Tiger - backing vocals
 Hanah Spring - backing vocals
 Lyn - backing vocals
 Gen Ittetsu, Daisuke Kadowaki, Maki Cameroun, Mori Takuya, Toshiyuki Muranaka, Yayoi Fujita - strings

References

External links
 

2016 concert tours
Misia concert tours
Concert tours of Japan